Lecithocera glabrata is a species of moth of the family Lecithoceridae. It is found in Jiangxi, Fujian, Hunan, Yunnan and Guizhou provinces of China and in Taiwan.

The wingspan is 12–13 mm.

External links
Lecithoceridae (Lepidoptera) of Taiwan (II): Subfamily Lecithocerinae: Genus Lecithocera Herrich-Schäffer and Its Allies

Moths described in 1992
glabrata